Lyubomir Tsekov (born 17 January 1990, in Plovdiv) is a Bulgarian footballer who plays as a forward.

Career
Born in Plovdiv, Tsekov began his football career with Lokomotiv Plovdiv. He made his first team debut in a 1–0 A PFG win over Belasitsa Petrich on 29 April 2008, coming on as a substitute for Gerasim Zakov.

In 2009, newly promoted B PFG side Brestnik 1948 signed Tsekov on loan. He netted Brestnik's only goal on his debut, a 2–1 defeat at Svetkavitsa on 15 August.

In June 2010, Tsekov joined Bdin Vidin and helped the team to B PFG promotion, contributing with 6 goals. In 2011 Tsekov joined Svilengrad 1921 and scored 12 goals during the season. 

After training with Lokomotiv Plovdiv one week, Tsekov re-signed for his native club on a -year contract on 30 January 2012.

References

Living people
1990 births
Bulgarian footballers
Association football forwards
PFC Lokomotiv Plovdiv players
OFC Bdin Vidin players
FC Sozopol players
First Professional Football League (Bulgaria) players